Metaxia is a genus of minute sea snails with right-handed shell-coiling, marine gastropod mollusks or micromollusks in the family Triphoridae, which are mostly left-handed in shell-coiling.

Species
 Metaxia abrupta (Watson, 1880)
 Metaxia albicephala Kay, 1979
 Metaxia bacillum (Issel, 1869)
 Metaxia brunnicephala Kay, 1979
 Metaxia carinapex Van der Linden, 1998
 Metaxia convexa (Carpenter, 1856)
 Metaxia diadema Bartsch, 1907
 Metaxia duplicarinata (Powell, 1940)
 Metaxia espinosai Rolán & Fernández-Garcés, 1992
 Metaxia exaltata (Powell, 1930)
 Metaxia excelsa Faber & Moolenbeek, 1991
 Metaxia fuscoapicata Thiele, 1930
 Metaxia gongyloskymnus Fernandes & Pimenta, 2011
 Metaxia hapax Van der Linden, 1998
 Metaxia incerta Fernandes & Rolán, 1988
 Metaxia kermadecensis B.A. Marshall, 1977
 Metaxia maoria (Finlay, 1930)
 Metaxia metaxa (delle Chiaje, 1828)
 Metaxia polynesica Rehder, 1980
 Metaxia prompta Rolán & Fernández-Garcés, 2008
 Metaxia propinqua Rolán & Fernández-Garcés, 2008
 Metaxia propria Rolán & Fernández-Garcés, 2008
 Metaxia protolineata (Laseron, 1951)
 Metaxia quadrata Faber, 2010
 Metaxia rugulosa (C. B. Adams, 1850)
 Metaxia solitaria B.A. Marshall, 1979
 Metaxia taeniolata (Dall, 1889)
 Metaxia tricarinata (Pease, 1861)
 Metaxia vicina (C. B. Adams, 1850)
Species brought into synonymy 
 Metaxia bacilla [sic] : synonym of Metaxia bacillum (Issel, 1869) (misspelling of Metaxia bacillum (Issel, 1869) )
 Metaxia exilis (C. B. Adams, 1850): synonym of Metaxia excelsa Faber & Moolenbeek, 1991
 Metaxia metaxae (delle Chiaje, 1828) : synonym of Metaxia metaxa (delle Chiaje, 1828)

References

 Gofas, S.; Le Renard, J.; Bouchet, P. (2001). Mollusca, in: Costello, M.J. et al. (Ed.) (2001). European register of marine species: a check-list of the marine species in Europe and a bibliography of guides to their identification. Collection Patrimoines Naturels, 50: pp. 180–213
 Bouchet P., Rocroi J.P., Hausdorf B., Kaim A., Kano Y., Nützel A., Parkhaev P., Schrödl M. & Strong E.E. (2017). Revised classification, nomenclator and typification of gastropod and monoplacophoran families. Malacologia. 61(1-2): 1-526; note: type species fixation under Art. 70.3

External links
 Monterosato T. A. (di) (1884). Nomenclatura generica e specifica di alcune conchiglie mediterranee. Palermo, Virzi, 152 pp
  Dall W.H. 1889. Reports on the results of dredging, under the supervision of Alexander Agassiz, in the Gulf of Mexico (1877-78) and in the Caribbean Sea (1879-80), by the U.S. Coast Survey Steamer "Blake", Lieut.-Commander C.D. Sigsbee, U.S.N., and Commander J.R. Bartlett, U.S.N., commanding. XXIX. Report on the Mollusca. Part 2, Gastropoda and Scaphopoda. Bulletin of the Museum of Comparative Zoölogy at Harvard College, 18: 1-492, pls. 10-40
 Marshall B.A. (1977). The dextral triforid genus Metaxia in the south-west Pacific. New Zealand Journal of Zoology. 4(2): 111-117
 Bouchet, P. (1985). Les Triphoridae de Méditerranée et du proche Atlantique (Mollusca, Gastropoda). Lavori, Società Italiana di Malacologia. 21: 5-58

Triphoridae